Kamiani Potoky is a village in Poltava Oblast (province) of central Ukraine. The village is located in Kremenchuk Raion (district) of the oblast. It is 21 km away from the center of Kremenchuk, and 9 km away from the Krukiv rail station.

Kamiani Potoky village was founded in the early years of 17th century by cossacks. Residents of the village took part in the 1624 rebellion under Zhmailo.

Famous people
A.P. Bulat - communist, commander of the 5th Red Cossacks Regiment - killed in 1920 near Perekop

References

Populated places on the Dnieper in Ukraine

Villages in Kremenchuk Raion